Craigmore is a village in Chipinge District of Manicaland Province, Zimbabwe located about 30 km south west of Chipinge.

Chipinge District
Populated places in Manicaland Province